The Polatiștea is a left tributary of the river Jiu in Romania. The upper reach of the river is also known as Obârșia Polatiștei or Căpriorul. It flows into the Jiu in the Jiu Gorge.

References

Rivers of Romania
Rivers of Hunedoara County